The  Kirchoff's Building is an Edwardian building on the corner of Jeppe and Loveday street in the city of Johannesburg. It was home to one of the oldest seed wholesalers in South Africa.

References

Bank buildings in South Africa
Buildings and structures in Johannesburg
Heritage Buildings in Johannesburg